Homemade Knives is an American Indie folk band formed by Wil Loyal, Shane Jenkins, and Christopher Carroll. Their music features layered of acoustic guitars, cello, and lead vocals. Homemade Knives has played with bands such as Magnolia Electric Company, Catfish Haven, and DeYarmond Edison. As of July 27, 2012, Homemade Knives are signed with Triple Stamp Records.

Members
Homemade Knives has five members:
 Wil Loyal' – vocals, acoustic guitar
 Anousheh Khalili – piano
 Jonathan Vassar – accordion, harmonica, backing vocals
 Ryan McLennan – acoustic bass guitar
 Christopher Carroll – cello

Former members:
 Nathan Joyce – bass guitar
 Shane Jenkins – acoustic guitar

Discography

Full length albums 
 No One Doubts the Darkness – 2007 – Triple Stamp Records

EPs
 Industrial Parks – 2006 – Triple Stamp Records

References 

Music of Richmond, Virginia
Musical groups from Virginia
American folk musical groups